HMCS Shawinigan was a  that served with the Royal Canadian Navy during the Second World War. She served primarily in the Battle of the Atlantic protecting convoys. She was sunk in 1944. She was named for Shawinigan, Quebec.

Background

Flower-class corvettes like Shawinigan serving with the Royal Canadian Navy during the Second World War were different from earlier and more traditional sail-driven corvettes. The "corvette" designation was created by the French as a class of small warships; the Royal Navy borrowed the term for a period but discontinued its use in 1877. During the hurried preparations for war in the late 1930s, Winston Churchill reactivated the corvette class, needing a name for smaller ships used in an escort capacity, in this case based on a whaling ship design. The generic name "flower" was used to designate the class of these ships, which – in the Royal Navy – were named after flowering plants.

Corvettes commissioned by the Royal Canadian Navy during the Second World War were named after communities for the most part, to better represent the people who took part in building them. This idea was put forth by Admiral Percy W. Nelles. Sponsors were commonly associated with the community for which the ship was named. Royal Navy corvettes were designed as open sea escorts, while Canadian corvettes were developed for coastal auxiliary roles which was exemplified by their minesweeping gear. Eventually the Canadian corvettes would be modified to allow them to perform better on the open seas.

Construction
Shawinigan was ordered 24 January 1940 as part of the 1939–1940 Flower-class building program and laid down on 4 June 1940 by Davie Shipbuilding & Repairing Co. Ltd. at Lauzon, Quebec. However she was not launched until almost a year later on 16 May 1941. Shawinigan was commissioned on 19 September 1941 at Quebec City, Quebec.

War service
Upon entering active service, Shawinigan joined Sydney Force in November 1941. She served there until transferring to the Newfoundland Escort Force on 13 January 1942. She made three round trips across the Atlantic before being assigned to Halifax Force in June 1942. She spent only a few months before being assigned to WLEF. Almost simultaneous with her new assignment, she went for a major refit that was completed in March 1943. In June she joined EG W-3. In April 1944 she underwent another refit and transferred to EG W-2 and worked up in Bermuda.

Sinking

On 24 November 1944 Shawinigan and  escorted the ferry Burgeo from Sydney to Port aux Basques. Sassafrass was detached from the escort without relief and Shawinigan was left alone. Shawinigan departed on an independent anti-submarine patrol and informed the ferry that it would meet her in the morning.

The next morning Burgeo left Port aux Basques on schedule but in the fog, could not find Shawinigan. Keeping radio silence and without informing command of Shawinigan's lack of appearance, Burgeo made for Sydney unescorted. When Burgeo arrived at Sydney at 6 PM that night, the navy knew that something had happened to Shawinigan.

Over the next three days searchers looked for survivors but could only find flotsam and eventually, six bodies. Shawinigan had been torpedoed by the  during the early morning of 25 November in Cabot Strait. All hands were lost.

See also
 List of current ships of the Royal Canadian Navy
 History of the Royal Canadian Navy

Notes

External links

  HMCS Shawinigan at the Arnold Hague Convoy Database
 
 

Flower-class corvettes of the Royal Canadian Navy
1941 ships
Ships sunk by German submarines in World War II
Ships lost with all hands
Maritime incidents in November 1944
World War II shipwrecks in the Atlantic Ocean